Viktor Muravin (born 1929) is an author, best known for his novel Aurora Borealis, also published under the title The Diary of Vikenty Angarov. Born in Vladivostok, in his youth  he joined the Pioneers and the Komsomol. He worked as a horse-wrangler and agricultural worker, and by 1978 he lived in New York City. His novel, partly based on a friend's experiences describes the survival of former sea-captain Angarov in the labor camps of Siberia.

Works

Notes

1929 births
Living people
Writers from Vladivostok
Russian anti-communists
Soviet emigrants to the United States
Russian male novelists
American writers of Russian descent
Soviet dissidents
Soviet expellees